Diaporthe toxica (anamorph Phomopsis sp. formerly P. leptostromiformis var. leptostromiformis) is a lupin endophyte and occasionally a plant pathogen. The fungus produces secondary metabolites that result in toxicosis of animals such as lupinosis of sheep when infected lupins are ingested by animals. The fungus produces mycotoxins called phomopsins, which cause liver damage.  Lupinosis has been incorrectly attributed to Diaporthe woodii but has now been shown to be a mycotoxicosis caused by the recently discovered (1994) teleomorphic fungus Diaporthe toxica.  The discovery and naming of this fungus concludes over a century of investigation into the cause of lupinosis since the first major outbreak in Germany in 1872. The infection process and life cycle in both resistant and susceptible lupins has been fully elucidated. This is the first record of resistance in a latent infection. Following this research rapid molecular breeding techniques have been developed leading to the production of many resistant lupin varieties. Lupinosis is no longer considered a disease of major importance to livestock producers in Western Australia. Lupins can now become part of the human diet.

References

External links
 Diaporthe toxica sp. nov., the cause of lupinosis in sheep 
 Formation of Subcuticular Coralloid Hyphae by Phomopsis Leptostromiformis
 Australian Veterinary History Record, pp.13-17
 Infraspecific variation demonstrated in Phomopsis leptostromiformis using cultural and biochemical techniques

Fungal plant pathogens and diseases
toxica